Anthony (Tony) Franken (born 11 January 1965) is a former Australian goalkeeper.

Biography
He represented Australia on 14 occasions between 1984–1992 and represented his country at Under-20 level at the 1983 World Youth Cup Finals in Mexico and at Under-23 level in 1984.

Tony started playing junior soccer for East Fremantle Tricolore before he played for many professional clubs in Australia including Sydney Croatia, APIA Leichhardt, Perth Glory, Sydney Olympic, Parramatta Eagles and Canberra City. He was awarded the NSL Under 21 Player of the Year in 1984.

He is currently on the coaching staff for the Australian national team.

References

External links 
Player Statistics at www.ozfootball.net

1965 births
Living people
Soccer players from Perth, Western Australia
Australian soccer players
Australia international soccer players
Australia B international soccer players
National Soccer League (Australia) players
Sydney Olympic FC players
Sydney United 58 FC players
Perth Glory FC players
APIA Leichhardt FC players
Parramatta FC players
Australian Institute of Sport soccer players
Association football goalkeepers